Michael Craig Thomas Potts (born 26 November 1991) is an English semi-professional footballer who plays for FC United of Manchester as a midfielder. He previously played for AFC Fylde, Blackburn Rovers, York City and Guiseley.

Career

Early career
Born in Preston, Lancashire, Potts played for Manchester United's youth teams all the way through high school. Throughout his time at United Potts was regarded as a striker. Potts attended Priory High School in Penwortham, Preston.

Blackburn Rovers
After being released at the end of his Youth Contract at Manchester United, Potts signed a contract with Blackburn Rovers in 2008. Although he never played a game for the first team, Potts became well known for his passing ability and had been reverted to a central midfielder.

York City
Potts signed for Conference Premier side York City on a two-year contract on 23 June 2011. He finished the 2011–12 season with 13 appearances as York were promoted to League Two via the play-offs. He made 14 appearances and scored three goals for York in the 2012–13 season, before being released on 30 April 2013.

Guiseley
Potts signed for Conference North side Guiseley on 14 August 2013 following a trial. He made 30 appearances and scored three goals in the 2013–14 season.

AFC Fylde
Potts signed for newly promoted Conference North club AFC Fylde on 20 June 2014.

Stalybridge Celtic
Potts joined Stalybridge Celtic for a 3-month loan spell on 2 February 2015.

Bradford Park Avenue
Bradford Park Avenue signed Potts as a free agent 1 June 2015.

Curzon Ashton
He then joined Curzon Ashton in 2016.

Bamber Bridge
He joined Bamber Bridge in August 2016.

FC United of Manchester
Potts joined FC United of Manchester on 26 October 2018. Potts took a break from football at the end of the 2021–22 season. In October 2022, Potts returned to the club.

Career statistics

Honours
York City

FA Trophy: 2011–12

References

External links

1991 births
Living people
Footballers from Preston, Lancashire
English footballers
Association football midfielders
Manchester United F.C. players
Blackburn Rovers F.C. players
York City F.C. players
Guiseley A.F.C. players
AFC Fylde players
Stalybridge Celtic F.C. players
Bradford (Park Avenue) A.F.C. players
Shaw Lane A.F.C. players
Curzon Ashton F.C. players
English Football League players
National League (English football) players
Bamber Bridge F.C. players